Évolène cattle are an old breed of dairy cattle from the Valais canton of Switzerland. It is an endangered cattle breed.

Characteristics 
The Évolène is a medium-sized, black pied or red pied breed, used more for beef production than milk production. Similar to the Herens, the Évolènes have a milk production of about 3,200 kg milk per year. Its fat content is about 3.8%. The breed is adapted to mountain pasture.  

Similar to Pinzgau Cattle, the white parts of the fur are mostly on the back and the abdomen. The cattle are very muscular, with noticeable neck muscles in the females. Évolènes have short, strong legs and a short, broad head. The horns are very strong and exceptionally long. The height of bulls is about 130 cm, the weight 600 to 700 kg. Cows are smaller; they are only 115 to 125 cm high and weigh between 400 and 500 kg.  

Similar to the Tux Cattle and the Herens, Évolène females are very aggressive, with cows fighting for their ranking in very long fights.

References

Cattle breeds
Cattle breeds originating in Switzerland